Khrapki is a rural locality (a village) in Pershinskoye Rural Settlement, Kirzhachsky District, Vladimir Oblast, Russia. The population was 170 as of 2010. There are 18 streets.

Geography 
Khrapki is located 8 km southwest of Kirzhach (the district's administrative centre) by road. Gribanovo is the nearest rural locality.

References 

Rural localities in Kirzhachsky District